International Surfing Association in Ecuador is a part of the International Surfing Association (ISA) is recognized by the International Olympic Committee as the world governing authority for surfing and all its waveriding disciplines, including bodyboard, kneeboard, longboard, tandem, skimboard and bodysurf. The ISA promotes its World Championship events as the true “Olympics” of the sport.

Surfing in Ecuador offers many beaches for surfing, with a coastline of 2,237 km or 1,390 miles long. Surfers enjoy the year round weather that is never to hot or cold, especially in the northern region where the weather conditions attract many surfers from all over the world. Ecuador´s neighbors of Chile & Peru offer great surfing in this part of South America.

Salinas, Ecuador, is a coastal city located in the Province of Santa Elena, Ecuador and was the site of the ISA World Junior Surfing Games Ecuador in 2009.

Surfing in Ecuador
Ecuador has many beaches for surfing with the coast of Ecuador being 2,237 km or 1,390 miles long. Surfers in Ecuador enjoy the year round weather that is never to hot or cold, especially in the northern region where the weather conditions attract many surfers from all over the world. Ecuador´s neighbors of Chile & Peru offer great surfing in this part of South America. Many people who surf in Ecuador use a protective wetsuit to protect themselves from the elements.
Surfing in Ecuador by tourists is very important to the local economy and the beaches offer significant enjoyment because of the top quality waves and affordable prices of lodgeing and food compared to the rest of the World. Plus many people who enjoy visiting Ecuador for Surfing pristine beaches and the nacional marine reserve that off the coast has a gigantic whale population.

References

 Ecuador Surfing Reports
 Surfing Breaks in Ecuador

Surfing competitions in Ecuador